The Stellantis Mangualde Plant, also known as CPMG (Centro de Produção de Mangualde) is an automotive assembly plant located in the city of Mangualde, Portugal, near Viseu. It produces Citroën Berlingo, Peugeot Partner/Rifter, Opel Combo/Combo Life, Fiat Doblò and Vauxhall Combo in conjunction with the Stellantis Vigo Plant.

History 
The plant was founded in 1962 and began operations in 1964 with the production of Citroën 2CV (AZL).  José Coelho dos Santos, a Portuguese industrialist, purchased a license to manufacture automobiles in 1962, which was later acquired by Citroën. Its first vehicle was the model AZL, popularly known as Citroën 2CV. They produced 472 cars that year.

The millionth car produced at the plant was manufactured in 2012.

Timeline 

1963: Purchase of  12130 m2. The factory covered an area of 8,150 m2.

1964: First vehicle, the Citroën AZL. 

1967: Purchase of land for the Administration building (Accounting and Administrative Management).

1969: Production reached 10 vehicles per day, across multiple models: AZL, AZU, AK, H, AMY, DS, AY and MHA.

1976: Production reached 35 vehicles day (4 models).

1977: First vehicles for export, a Citroën FAF.

1980: Existing warehouse area increased, purchase and construction of a parking area  for customs-cleared vehicles and construction of Surface Treatment (TTS) and Anti-Corrosion Treatment (Trempé Epoxy).

1984: Increased warehouse space. Fatal fire, on May 3, in the building of upholstery and wiring.

1987: Twenty-fifth anniversary. Major Citroën reorganization.

1990: Manufacture of AX and production of 50 vehicles per day. Installations for wiring and fitting and installation of a new and better anti-corrosion system: the "Cataphorèse". In July, production of the last 2cv.

1994: New upholstery section.

1995: Renewal of Painting with the construction of the primary greenhouse. Certified by UTAC with the classification of A95.

1996: Creation of the 2nd Team. Beginning of Citroën Saxo production.

1998: Production of 1st Generation Citroën Berlingo and Peugeot Partner

2000: Third shift

2001: Gold medal of the city of Mangualde.

2002: New painting retouching boxes. Construction of the Bout d'Usine building.

2003: Transfer of administrative services and canteen to a new building. Construction of the Bout d'Usine / Pier Hardware / Line Engines.

2006: Construction of the CKD building.

2009: Second generation Citroën Berlingo and Peugeot Partner.

2010: Participation in the construction of the roundabout "2CV" at the city entrance

2011: Construction of 3 car parks and EN16 (National Highway Nº16) integration.

2012: 1,000,000 vehicles produced. 50th anniversary.

2015: Announcement of the award for the production of the new model for 2018.

Daily production

Annual production 

– Sources:

Current production 
 Citroën Berlingo/Berlingo Van Mk3(K9) (2018-present)
 Peugeot Partner/Rifter Mk3 (K9) (2018-present)
 Opel Combo E/Combo Life (K9) (2018-present)
 Fiat Doblò (October 2022-present))

Former production 
Prior production:

 Citroën 2CV (AZL) (1964 - 27, July, 1990)
 Citroën 2CV Fourgonette (AZU) (1964 - 1970)
 Citroën 2CV Fourgonette (AK) (1965 - 1976)
 Citroën H Van (1965 - 1976)
 Citroën Ami (1965 - 1976)
 Citroën DS (1966 - 1975) 
 Citroën Dyane (AY) (1967 - 1983)
 Citroën Méhari (MHA) (1969 - 1983)
 Citroën GS (1970 - 1976)
 Citroën FAF (1977 - 1982)
 Citroën CX (1979 - 1982)
 Citroën GSA (1980 - 1981)
 Citroën Visa (1981 - 1987)
 Citroën AX (1990 - 1998)
 Citroën Saxo (1996 - 2000)
 Citroën Berlingo / Peugeot Partner Mk1 (M59) (1998 - 2011)
 Peugeot Partner Mk2 (B9) (2009–2018)
 Citroën Berlingo Mk2 (B9) (2009–2018)

See also 
 Groupe PSA
 Citroën

References

External links 
 

 
Motor vehicle assembly plants in Portugal
Car manufacturers of Portugal
Viseu
Mangualde
Mangualde
1962 establishments in Portugal